The 1983 Fenland District Council election took place on 5 May 1983 to elect all members of Fenland District Council in the Isle of Ely, Cambridgeshire, England. 1987 Fenland District Council election was due and held on 7 May 1987.

1983 Fenland District Council elections

Ward results
(* denotes sitting councillor)



















































References

Fenland District Council elections
1983 English local elections